The 1935 Atlantic hurricane season included the Labor Day hurricane, the most intense tropical cyclone to ever strike the United States or any landmass in the Atlantic basin. The season ran from June 1 through November 15, 1935. Ten tropical cyclones developed, eight of which intensified into tropical storms. Five of the tropical storms strengthened into hurricanes, while three of those reached major hurricane intensity. The season was near-normal for activity and featured five notable systems. The second storm of the season sank many ships and vessels offshore Newfoundland, causing 50 fatalities. In early September, the Labor Day hurricane struck Florida twice – the first time as a Category 5 hurricane – resulting in about 490 deaths and $100 million (1935 USD) in damage along its path.

Late in September, the Cuba hurricane struck the country as a Category 3 and later the Bahamas as a Category 4. The hurricane caused 52 fatalities and roughly $14.5 million in damage. The Jérémie hurricane caused significant impacts in Cuba, Haiti, Honduras, and Jamaica in the month of October. Overall, the storm was attributed to about 2,150 deaths and $16 million in damage, with more than 2,000 fatalities in Haiti alone. The Yankee hurricane struck the Bahamas and Florida in early November. The system resulted in 19 deaths, while damage totaled roughly $5.5 million. Collectively, the tropical cyclones of the 1935 Atlantic hurricane season caused roughly $136 million in damage and 2,761 fatalities.

The season's activity was reflected with an accumulated cyclone energy (ACE) rating of 106 units, slightly higher than the 1931–1943 average of 91.2. ACE is a metric used to express the energy used by a tropical cyclone during its lifetime. Therefore, a storm with a longer duration will have high values of ACE. It is only calculated at six-hour increments in which specific tropical and subtropical systems are either at or above sustained wind speeds of 39 mph (63 km/h), which is the threshold for tropical storm intensity. Thus, tropical depressions are not included here.


Timeline

Systems

Tropical Storm One 

The depression moved north-northwestward and made landfall in Santo Domingo Este, Dominican Republic, about 12 hours later. After emerging into the Atlantic Ocean near the Turks and Caicos Islands, the cyclone intensified and became a tropical storm around 12:00 UTC on May 16. The storm then began to curve northeastward and accelerate.

Hurricane Two 

The depression tracked north-northwestward and intensified into a tropical storm around 00:00 UTC on August 18, while situated between the islands of Antigua and Barbuda. Continuing north-northwestward, the cyclone intensified into a hurricane while north of the Lesser Antilles at 00:00 UTC on August 19. Curving west-northwest, the storm gradually intensified into a Category 2 hurricane the following day. On August 20, the system began to curve northward and later north-northeastward. The cyclone peaked with winds of 130 mph (215 km/h) on August 22, but weakened to a minimal Category 3 hurricane with winds of 115 mph (195 km/h) by the time it passed just west of Bermuda later that day. On August 24, the storm weakened to a Category 2 hurricane and began to turn more northward. Continuing to curve northwestward on August 25, the system continued to weaken to a Category 1 hurricane, later striking Newfoundland as an extratropical cyclone on August 26. The storm dissipated later that day.

Penned as Newfoundland's "worst gale in 36 years," the remnants of the hurricane battered the island with damaging winds. Charlottetown in Prince Edward Island received  of rain over a three-day span. In St. John's, Newfoundland, wind gusts averaged  and caused extensive property damage. Total losses were estimated in the thousands of dollars. Communication lines across the island were downed, though the greatest effects were felt offshore. Gale-force winds and rough seas wrecked multiple schooners off the coast of Newfoundland, claiming an estimated 50 lives. Every ship that set sail within a day of the storm was damaged. Six people drowned when Walter sank near Trepassey. The SS Argyle was dispatched on search and rescue for three other vessels; however, upon discovery of the ships they reported no sign of life and their crew are believed to have been washed overboard. In the days following the storm, wrecks of schooners, such as the Carrie Evelyn, washed ashore.

Hurricane Three 

The Great Labor Day Hurricane of 1935 

The depression initially strengthened slowly as it moved west-northwestward and then westward, reaching tropical storm intensity by early on August 31. Later that day and on the following day, the system passed through the Bahamas and reached hurricane intensity around 12:00 UTC on September 1. After passing near the south end of Andros Island, the storm rapidly intensified while moving across the Straits of Florida, achieving major hurricane status by 06:00 UTC on the next day. At approximately 00:00 UTC on September 3, the cyclone intensified into a Category 5 hurricane, with winds peaking at 185 mph (295 km/h). About two hours later, the hurricane made landfall on Long Key at the same intensity. The storm made its final landfall on the sparsely populated Apalachee coast near Cedar Key on September 4 as a Category 2 hurricane. Turning northeast, the system weakened to a tropical storm over Georgia on September 5, but re-intensified into a hurricane on September 6 shortly after emerging into the Atlantic offshore Virginia. The storm transitioned into an extratropical cyclone later that day, but persisted until being absorbed by another extratropical cyclone offshore southern Greenland on September 10.

In the Bahamas, the press stated that no damage occurred, though one report indicated that the storm caused some damage in extreme southern Andros Island. With a minimum pressure of  upon landfall in the Florida Keys, the hurricane became the most intense tropical cyclone to ever strike the United States or any landmass in the Atlantic basin. The storm remained the most intense tropical cyclone in the Atlantic basin until Hurricane Gilbert in 1988 and later Hurricane Wilma in 2005. The Labor Day hurricane also remains one of only four storms to strike the United States at Category 5 intensity, the others being Camille in 1969, Andrew in 1992, and Michael in 2018. A train intending to evacuate people to safety arrived too late; storm surge prevented the train from advancing past Islamorada and instead washed it off the tracks except for the locomotive and tender. The hurricane caused near total destruction of all buildings, bridges, roads, and viaducts between Tavernier and Key Vaca, including portions of the Florida East Coast Railway in the Upper Keys. Also heavily impacted were three Federal Emergency Relief Administration camps of World War I veterans. By March 1, 1936, officials had confirmed 485 deaths in the Florida Keys, with 257 veterans and 228 civilians killed. Along Florida's gulf coast, the hurricane impacted Cedar Key particularly severely. Nearly all roofs experienced at least minor damage, many of which were blown off, while winds also downed many trees and power lines. The cyclone also severely damaged docks and fishing vessels. Three deaths occurred in the town. Rains and winds damaged some crops and properties in Georgia and the Carolinas. In Virginia, one tornado in Norfolk caused about $22,000 in property damage while a second near Farmville resulted in about $55,000 in damage and two deaths. Further, flooding along the James River inflicted damage around $1.65 million. Overall, the hurricane caused approximately $100 million in damage.

Tropical Storm Four 

A tropical depression formed in the northwestern Caribbean on August 30. The system moved westward and soon made landfall in the Yucatán Peninsula near Playa del Carmen. After emerging into the Bay of Campeche on the following day, the cyclone intensified into a tropical storm. By early on September 1, the system peaked with sustained winds of 60 mph (95 km/h). Around 18:00 UTC that day, the storm made landfall in the Mexican state of Veracruz to the southeast of the city of Veracruz. After moving inland, the storm quickly weakened to a tropical depression early on September 2, before dissipating several hours later. Authorities closed the Port of Veracruz. Heavy rains generated by the system washed out train tracks, delaying railroad traffic.

Hurricane Five 

The Cuba Hurricane of 1935 

The origin of this hurricane is uncertain, though it is believed to have coalesced into a tropical depression over the central Caribbean Sea on September 23. The disturbance gradually organized as it moved to the west, and strengthened to tropical storm intensity less than a day after formation and further to a hurricane by September 25. The cyclone subsequently curved northward from its initial westward motion. On September 27, the storm reached major hurricane intensity before making landfall near Cienfuegos, Cuba, as a Category 3 hurricane the next day. After passing the island, the system reintensified and peaked with a minimum barometric pressure below 945 mbar (hPa; 27.91 inHg) and maximum sustained winds of 140 mph (220 km/h), making it a Category 4 hurricane. At the same time, the tropical cyclone passed over the Bahamian island of Bimini before moving out to sea. As it progressed northeastward, the hurricane gradually weakened before transitioning into an extratropical storm on October 2. The extratropical remnants traversed Newfoundland before dissipating later that day.

The hurricane caused widespread destruction from destruction from the Greater Antilles to Atlantic Canada. In Jamaica, the storm's strong winds and heavy rain destroyed roughly 3 percent of the island's banana production and damaged road networks. Damage on the island country totaled to $2.7 million and two people died. In Cayman Brac, strong winds damaged infrastructure and crops, though no fatalities resulted. Most of the cyclone's deaths occurred in Cuba, where the storm made its first landfall. A large storm surge destroyed low-lying coastal towns, particularly in Cienfuegos where numerous homes were destroyed and 17 people died. Throughout the nation, the hurricane wrought $12 million in damage and killed 35 people. As it crossed Cuba, widespread evacuation procedures occurred in southern areas of Florida, heightened due to the effects of a disastrous hurricane which struck less than a month prior. However, damage there was only of moderate severity. Passing directly over Bimini in The Bahamas, a large storm surge destroyed nearly half of the island; 14 people were killed here. Farther north, the storm had slight impacts in Bermuda and Atlantic Canada, though a person drowned off of Halifax, Nova Scotia, due to rough seas.

Hurricane Six 

A broad low-pressure area organized into a tropical depression over the southwestern Caribbean around 12:00 UTC on October 18. Initially moving eastward, the depression intensified into a tropical storm roughly 24 hours later. The cyclone then began to curve north-northeastward and move very slowly. Around 13:00 UTC on October 21, the system made landfall in Jamaica near the Morant Point Lighthouse with winds of 60 mph (100 km/h). The storm reached hurricane intensity early on October 22 and made landfall near Santiago de Cuba later that day with winds of 85 mph (140 km/h). Although the storm curved southwestward and re-entered the Caribbean, land interaction with Cuba weakened it to a tropical storm early on October 23. The storm re-intensified into a hurricane about eight hours later. On October 26, it made landfall in Honduras near Cabo Gracias a Dios as a Category 1 hurricane. The cyclone maintained intensity after moving inland before weakening to a tropical storm on October 26, eventually weakening to a tropical depression on October 27 over interior Central America. The system dissipated shortly thereafter.

Flooding and landslides in Jamaica damaged crops, property, and infrastructure; fruit growers alone suffered about $2.5 million in losses. Just offshore, an unidentified vessel went down with her entire crew in the hostile conditions. Strong winds lashed coastal sections of Cuba, particularly in and around Santiago de Cuba. There, the hurricane demolished 100 homes and filled streets with debris. A total of four people died in the country. In Haiti, the storm did most damage along the Tiburon Peninsula of southwestern Haiti, especially in Jacmel and Jérémie. Catastrophic river flooding left roughly 2,000 people dead, razed hundreds of native houses, and destroyed crops and livestock. Entire swaths of countryside were isolated for days, delaying both reconnaissance and relief efforts. The hurricane later unleashed devastating floods in Central America, chiefly in Honduras. Reported at the time to be the worst flood in the nation's history, the disaster decimated banana plantations and communities after rivers flowed up to 50 ft (15 m) above normal. Torrents of floodwaters trapped hundreds of citizens in trees, on rooftops, and on remote high ground, requiring emergency rescue. The storm left thousands homeless and around 150 dead in the country, while monetary damage totaled $12 million. Flooding and strong winds also impacted northeastern Nicaragua, though damage was much less widespread.

Hurricane Seven 

The Yankee Hurricane of 1935 or The Miami Hurricane of 1935

After reaching hurricane intensity around 12:00 UTC on the next day, the cyclone curved west-southwestward. The system then turned south-southwestward by early on November 3, around the time that it reached Category 2 strength. Peaking with winds of 105 mph (165 km/h) and a minimum pressure of  shortly thereafter, the storm curved southwestward later that day while approaching the Bahamas. Just after 00:00 UTC on November 4, the hurricane struck North Abaco at the same intensity. The cyclone then continued west-southwestward and made landfall in Miami-Dade County, Florida, near present-day Bal Harbour around 18:00 UTC on November 4 with winds of 100 mph (155 km/h). The storm emerged into the Gulf of Mexico early the following day and weakened to a tropical storm around 00:00 UTC on November 6 while beginning to curve west-northwestward. Thereafter, the system decelerated and curved westward late on November 7, at which time it weakened to a tropical depression.

On the former, the storm sank five sponging vessels and caused 14 deaths. The storm is known as the Yankee hurricane in Florida due to its unusual approach toward Florida from the north and its arrival late in the season. However, little structural damage occurred except to buildings with defect roofs. In Hialeah, considered the worst hit city in the Miami area, approximately 230 homes suffered complete destruction, while many others sustained damage. Among the others buildings severely damaged or destroyed in the city included two churches, a building occupied by two businesses, and a warehouse. The storm uprooted 75 percent of avocado trees and 80 percent of citrus trees, while floodwaters inundated about 95 percent of potatoes in Miami-Dade County. In Broward County, the town of Dania Beach appeared to suffer the worst damage in the county, with approximately 90 percent of buildings damaged to some degree there. Throughout the county, the hurricane damaged at least 40 homes beyond repairs, while over 350 homes suffered minor damages requiring repairs. A total of 5 deaths were reported, along with injuries to 115 people. The hurricane caused approximately $5.5 million in damage in Florida, $4.5 million of which was incurred to properties.

Tropical Storm Eight 

The cyclone initially moved northeastward and reached tropical storm intensity around 18:00 UTC. The storm curved southeastward late on November 4 and then southwestward about 24 hours later. Late on November 6, the system turned to the west. The storm weakened to a tropical depression early on November 9 and began to execute a cyclonic loop. Around 12:00 UTC on November 10, it re-intensified into a tropical storm. The storm completed its cyclonic loop by November 12 and resumed moving south-southwestward.

Other systems 
In addition to the eight gale-force systems identified within HURDAT, two other cyclones were classified as tropical depressions. The first of these developed over the northern Gulf of Mexico on August 23. On this day, a ship observed sustained winds of 35 mph (55 km/h)—the highest in relation to the system. The lowest observed pressure of 1008 mbar (hPa; 29.77 inHg) was recorded on August 25. Researchers at the National Hurricane Center (NHC) noted that the system may have become a weak tropical storm, but a lack of concrete evidence prevented classification as such. Remaining nearly stationary for four days, the depression finally moved northeast on August 27 and made landfall over the Florida Panhandle. The system weakened once onshore and dissipated over Georgia on August 29. The second depression was identified near the Cape Verde Islands on October 2. A nearly stationary system, the depression lingered for three days before diminishing. Ships on October 2 reported sustained winds of 35 mph (55 km/h) and a pressure of 1006 mbar (hPa; 29.71 inHg). The depression may have been a tropical storm, but this could not be conclusively assessed.

Season effects 
This is a table of all of the storms that have formed during the 1935 Atlantic hurricane season. It includes their names, duration, peak strength, areas affected, damage, and death totals. Deaths in parentheses are additional and indirect (an example of an indirect death would be a traffic accident), but were still related to that storm. Damage and deaths include totals while the storm was extratropical, a wave, or a low, and all of the damage figures are in 1935 USD.

See also 

 List of tropical cyclones
 Atlantic hurricane season

Notes

References

External links 

 Monthly Weather Review